Child Marriage in the Central African Republic. As of 2017, in The Central African Republic, 68% of girls are married off before the age of 18, while 29% are married before they turn 15. The Central African Republic is the nation with the 2nd highest percentage of child marriages in the world.

References 

Central African Republic
Marriage in Africa
Women in the Central African Republic
Society of the Central African Republic
Children's rights in the Central African Republic
Human rights abuses in the Central African Republic
Women's rights in the Central African Republic
Violence against women in the Central African Republic